Lepidochrysops ringa, the Tite's giant Cupid, is a butterfly in the family Lycaenidae. It is found in northern Nigeria and western Cameroon. The habitat consists of Guinea savanna.

References

Butterflies described in 1959
Lepidochrysops